Jannaschia rubra is a Gram-negative, strictly aerobic, and slightly halophilic bacterium from the genus of Jannaschia which has been isolated from sea water near Valencia in Spain.

References

External links
 microbewiki Jannaschia rubra

Rhodobacteraceae
Bacteria described in 2005